Exposome-NL is a 10-year Dutch research program of multiple Dutch universities collaborating in the field of exposome research. Researchers from fields such as exposure science, environmental science, cardiovascular and metabolic health, clinical epidemiology, nutritional epidemiology, geosciences, agent-based modelling, molecular biology, chemistry and bioinformatics and biostatistics work together within the Exposome-NL research program. 

In 2019, the program was awarded funding of 17.4 million euros through a Gravitation program of the Dutch Research Council. The participating institutes contribute an additional 8 million euros to the program.  The national Exposome-NL research program, led by Prof. Roel Vermeulen,  started in January 2020.

Research Lines 
The scientific research of Exposome-NL is organised in three research lines.
 Measuring the exposome
 Linking exposome and health
 Developing exposome interventions

Education 
In February 2021, Exposome-NL organised a publicly accessible  Massive open online course (MOOC) about the exposome.

Partners 
 VU University Medical Center and Academic Medical Center (Amsterdam)
 University of Groningen
 Leiden University 
 University Medical Center Utrecht
 Utrecht University

Executive Board 
The board consists of the six Principal Investigators of Exposome-NL
 Roel Vermeulen - Utrecht University
 Joline Beulens - VU University Medical Center
 Rick Grobbee - Utrecht University
 Sasha Zhernakova - University of Groningen
 Thomas Hankemeier - Leiden University
 Mei-Po Kwan - Utrecht University

Scientific Advisory Board 
 Prof. Eric Rimm - Harvard University
 Prof. Jeff Brooks - University of Toronto
 Prof. Dean Jones - Emory University
 Prof. Effy Vayena - ETH Zurich
 Prof. Maria De lorio - National University of Singapore

References

External links 
 Website Exposome-NL

Environment and health
Research in the Netherlands